Credit Sesame is a credit and loan company. Credit Sesame was launched in private beta at TechCrunch Disrupt 2010. By 2012, the company claimed to monitor almost $35 billion in loans.

Leadership 
Credit Sesame was founded on April 1, 2010 by Adrian Nazari, the company's chief executive officer. Nazari previously co-founded Financial Crossing, Inc. and served as both its president and its CEO. He was also the founder, CEO, and Chairman of the Board at Financial Circuit, Inc.

On June 8, 2022, David Bagatelle became the Chief Banking Officer and Head of Banking and Credit Sesame.

Product and services 

As of 2018, Credit Sesame gives its members free access to credit score monitoring, credit reports, and identity protection tools. It also provides personalized recommendations regarding personal loans, home loans, student loans, credit cards, and refinancing opportunities that can help members improve their credit and spending power. In 2017, Credit Sesame announced new robo advisory technology for consumers to automate their credit and loan management.

Business model 

Credit Sesame sometimes receives revenue from partners when a member acts on recommendations made for a product, such as new credit cards and loans. Revenue is also generated from its Premium Subscription Business as well as hosting targeted advertising from third parties and initiating loans to help manage billions of dollars in consumer debt. As of October 2018, Credit Sesame has managed over $2 billion in loans originating from its site.

Funding 

In March 2011, Credit Sesame announced that it had closed a $6.15 million second round of funding, led by Menlo Ventures and Inventus Capital Partners. The company closed an additional $12 million in funding in June 2012, and $16 million in May 2015. In October 2017, Credit Sesame announced that it raised more than $42 million in funding from investors (including Menlo Ventures, Inventus Capital, Globespan Capital, IA Capital, and SF Capital). The company also announced reaching profitability in 2017, after achieving 3 straight years of 100% annual growth.

In August 2019, Credit Sesame completed an additional round of funding totaling $43 million.

References 

Financial services companies established in 2010
Credit management
Companies based in Sunnyvale, California
Privately held companies based in California
American companies established in 2010
2010 establishments in California